Lasak is a surname. Notable people with the surname include:

Françoise Lasak (born 1968), French sprint canoeist
Ján Lašák (born 1979), Slovak ice hockey player
Matěj Lasák (born 1992), Czech cyclist
Olivier Lasak (born 1967), French sprint canoeist